Human rights in Madagascar are protected under the national constitution. However, the extent to which such rights are reflected in practice, is subject to debate. The 2009 Human Rights Report by the United States Department of State noted concerns regarding the suspension of democratic electoral processes as the result of recent political unrest. Furthermore, reports of corruption, arbitrary arrest and child labor highlight the prevalence of human rights issues in the country.

Constitution and statutory responses

The Constitution of Madagascar was adopted in 2010. It addresses the notion of universal suffrage, individual rights and the freedom of speech.

Laws regarding a minimum age for employment as well as the prohibition of child labor were passed.

International treaties
Madagascar's stances on international human rights treaties are as follows:

Issues

Censorship
Accusations of media censorship have risen due to the alleged restrictions on the coverage of government opposition. During the leadership conflict, Ravalomanana ordered the closure of "Viva TV", which was owned by his opponent, Rajoelina.

Equality
Women's suffrage was officially recognized in 1959. However violence against women and human trafficking continues to be an issue in society.

Legal system
The existence of key legal principles such as the rule of law and due process, is in question due to the increase in arbitrary and politically motivated arrests during the leadership conflict. In December 2014, the List of Goods Produced by Child Labor or Forced Labor indicated that children in Madagascar engaged in 3 activities namely vanilla production, stone quarrying, and sapphire mining.

Poverty
The people of Madagascar are afflicted by extreme levels and rates of poverty.  As of 2005, the Eastern coast of the country had astoundingly high poverty rates of around 80% while urban areas are just over 50%.  Over 20% of the population lived on under $11.25 per day and over 80% of the population on under $15.00 per day as of 2010. 

The country has seen major improvements in literacy rates. Generally, a correlation exists between literacy rates and poverty.  Should the progress in increasing the number of literate Madagascans continue, poverty rates should begin to decline respectively.

Historical situation
The following chart shows Madagascar's ratings since 1972 in the Freedom in the World reports, published annually by Freedom House. A rating of 1 is "free"; 7, "not free".

See also 

Human trafficking in Madagascar
Internet censorship and surveillance in Madagascar
LGBT rights in Madagascar
Politics of Madagascar
 2006 Malagasy coup d'état attempt

Notes 
1.Note that the "Year" signifies the "Year covered". Therefore the information for the year marked 2008 is from the report published in 2009, and so on.
2.As of 1 January.
3.The 1982 report covers 1981 and the first half of 1982, and the following 1984 report covers the second half of 1982 and the whole of 1983. In the interest of simplicity, these two aberrant "year and a half" reports have been split into three year-long reports through interpolation.

References

External links
 2012 Annual Report, by Amnesty International
 Freedom in the World 2011 Report, by Freedom House
 Human rights in Madagascar on OHCHR website

 
Madagascar
Politics of Madagascar